Barchester Healthcare Ltd is an independent care provider in the United Kingdom, running over 250 care homes and seven registered hospitals across the country. The organisation employs over 17,000 staff in care homes which offer residential and nursing care. The organisation's head office is located in Finsbury Square, London. It also has offices in Berkhamsted, Oxfordshire, Milton Keynes, Wiltshire and Inverness.

The chief executive, Dr Pete Calveley received a salary of £2.28 million in 2020.  In response to criticism the company said 84.9% of Barchester’s services had been rated as ‘Good’ or ‘Outstanding’ by the Care Quality Commission - more than doubled during his time in the job. 

Barchester Healthcare is considered one of the 'Big 5' UK later life care providers. With over 13,000 beds available it is 3rd in terms of bed capacity behind only HC-One and Four Seasons.

History

Barchester Healthcare was founded in 1992 by Mike Parsons. After finding it difficult to find a good quality care home for two of his relatives, he bought Moreton Hill, a 17th-century farm in the Cotswolds, and converted it into a care home which he felt was of a sufficiently high standard. In 1994, Moreton Hill won the Care Home Design award at the Great South Western Care Awards and featured on BBC's Countryfile as an example of design sympathetically managed for a rural environment.

The next care homes to be opened by Parsons were Badgeworth Court Care Home and Hunters Care Centre in 1995. Barchester has continued to expand its portfolio through new builds and acquisitions and as of October 2021, it runs over 250 homes across the country, making it the third largest care-home group in the UK.

In 2018 it was reported that Barchester Healthcare Ltd. was being put up for sale by Grove Investments, an investment company owned by three Irish businessmen; Dermot Desmond, JP McManus and John Magnier. It was reported that the asking price for the group, that turns over c.£600 million a year, was in the region of £2.5 billion. 

It took over 14 care homes from Four Seasons Health Care in December 2019.

It has five homes in Dorset, the newest, Parley Place, in West Parley opened in November 2022 has 68 ensuite rooms and charges from £1,350 a week.

References

External links
 Barchester Healthcare
 

Nursing homes in the United Kingdom
Private providers of NHS services
Social care in the United Kingdom